Huatasani District is one of eight districts of the province Huancané in Peru.

Ethnic groups 
The district straddles the Quechua and Aymara linguistic boundary with Aymara-speaking Huancane to the south and Quechua-speaking Putina to the north. Huatasani itself is predominantly Quechua speaking but contains both Quechua- and Aymara-speaking communities. Quechua is the language which 53.87% of the population learnt to speak in childhood, 28.84% of the residents started speaking using Aymara and 17.20% learnt Spanish as the first language (2007 Peru Census).

References